Arne Thomassen (born 13 February 1959) is a Norwegian politician for the Conservative Party.

He served as a deputy representative to the Parliament of Norway from Aust-Agder during the terms 2009–2013, 2013–2017 and 2017–2021.

He has been an elected member of Aust-Agder county council, mayor of Lillesand and leader of Aust-Agder Conservative Party.

References

1959 births
Living people
People from Lillesand
Mayors of places in Aust-Agder
Deputy members of the Storting
Conservative Party (Norway) politicians